The khat was a head cloth worn by the nobility of Ancient Egypt. Simpler than the nemes head-dress, it did not have pleats or stripes, and hung down open in the back rather than being tied together.

History
The khat dates to the reign of the First Dynasty king Den at least. On an ivory label found at Abydos, Den is shown wearing the khat and brandishing a mace.

Archaeological examples made of linen have been found.

References
Toby A. H. Wilkinson, Early Dynastic Egypt, Routledge 1999

Notes

Egyptian artefact types